Chaoyang Airport  is an airport serving the city of Chaoyang in Liaoning Province, China.  Constructed in 1933, the airport served commercial flights in the 1960s, 1980s, and 1990s.  The most recent expansion was completed in October 2007 and flights resumed in 2008.

Airlines and destinations

See also
List of airports in China
List of the busiest airports in China

References

Airports in Liaoning
Airports established in 1933
1933 establishments in China
Chaoyang, Liaoning